Fredrik Lindgren is a Swedish former professional ice hockey defenceman. He played the entirety of his career with Skellefteå AIK of the Swedish Hockey League.

References

External links

1980 births
Living people
Leksands IF players
Skellefteå AIK players
Swedish ice hockey defencemen